Pedro Julio Payano (born September 27, 1994) is a Dominican-American professional baseball pitcher who is a free agent. He has played in Major League Baseball (MLB) for the Texas Rangers.

Career

Texas Rangers
Payano was born in New York City but raised in San Francisco de Macorís, Dominican Republic. He signed with the Texas Rangers as an international free agent on June 1, 2012.

Payano spent the 2012, 2013, and 2014 seasons playing for the DSL Rangers of the Rookie-level Dominican Summer League. In 2015, he split the season between the DSL Rangers, AZL Rangers of the Rookie-level Arizona League, and the Hickory Crawdads of the Class A South Atlantic League, posting a combined 10–2 record with a 1.11 ERA over 87 innings. His 2016 season was spent with Hickory, going 3–3 with a 2.08 ERA in 73.2 innings. He split 2017 between the Down East Wood Ducks of the Class A-Advanced Carolina League and the Frisco RoughRiders of the Class AA Texas League, going 6–8 with a 3.87 ERA over 134.1 innings. He spent the 2018 season with Frisco, going 5–10 with a 5.54 ERA over 118.2 innings. He elected free agency during the 2018 off-season but re-signed with Texas on a minor league contract. He opened the 2019 season back with Frisco, before being promoted to the Nashville Sounds of the Triple-A Pacific Coast League on May 29. Payano combined for a 5–4 record with a 4.93 ERA over 83.1 innings between the two levels. 

On July 6, 2019, the Rangers selected Payano's contract and promoted him to the major leagues. He made his debut that day, pitching a scoreless inning in relief. In 2019, Payano produced a 1–2 record with a 5.73 ERA in 22 MLB innings.

Payano was designated for assignment on September 1 and was outrighted to Nashville on September 3. He became a free agent following the 2019 season.

New York Mets
On December 12, 2019, Payano signed a minor league contract with the New York Mets. Payano was released on September 5, 2020.

Detroit Tigers
On February 8, 2021, Payano signed a minor league contract with the Detroit Tigers organization.

Cincinnati Reds
On February 1, 2022, Payano signed a minor league contract with the Cincinnati Reds. He elected free agency on November 10, 2022.

References

External links

1994 births
Living people
American sportspeople of Dominican Republic descent
Baseball players from New York City
People from San Francisco de Macorís
Major League Baseball pitchers
Texas Rangers players
Dominican Summer League Rangers players
Arizona League Rangers players
Hickory Crawdads players
Down East Wood Ducks players
Frisco RoughRiders players
Nashville Sounds players
Toros del Este players
Erie SeaWolves players
Toledo Mud Hens players
Louisville Bats players